Last Escort is a series of host club-themed otome games by D3 Publisher for PlayStation 2 and PlayStation Portable.

History 

The first title was announced at Tokyo Game Show 2005 with a list price of 5040 yen, scheduled for a winter 2005 release. On August 6, 2006, D3 Publisher held an event, Twinkle Date~Ii Ase Kakouze-Natsu!~, featuring the voice actors from Last Escort, along with those of one of D3's other otome games, Bakumatsu Renka Shinsengumi. Merchandise for both series was sold at the event, and a corresponding DVD was released on October 20, 2006.

A web game spinoff optimized for mobile phones of the time, titled Last Escort ~Koisuru Mobile~, was released on January 26, 2006, and playable through a subscription to D3 Publisher's "Kochira Mune Kyun Otome" service, which cost 315 yen monthly. In order to play the game, an email address which is displayed in the PS2 game was required. A trial version was also published. The game is no longer available.

In 2010, Last Escort: Club Katze was the first multi-platform release in the series. An exclusive event limited to Mune Kyun Club members was held that same year with voice actors from the game, called Last Escort: Real Katze.

In a 2018 interview, voice actor Yūto Suzuki expressed interest in creating a VR installment of the Last Escort series.

Last Escort: Shinya no Kokuchou Monogatari

Plot 
Main character Akari Sagami has lived a meandering lifestyle ever since she graduated high school. However, one day, her father tells her, "If you're not interested in getting married, you need to get a part time job", so she must get a part-time job. As Akari goes out on the town in search of part-time work, she witnesses someone who seems to be her former high school classmate Yuichiro Kashimiya walking with a flamboyant woman. She loses sight of him on that day, but in the following days sees him once more. She follows him, arriving at the host club Akari's parents manage, which is scheduled to close down - Gorgeous.

Last Escort 2: Shinya no Amai Toge 
This is a computer game sequel to Last Escort. When the player has played the previous title, and there is save data with Chihiro's ending cleared, the player can then enjoy "Special Story", which shows a continuation of the storyline with Chihiro.

Plot 
After graduating from college, Serika Andou works as an editor for a fashion magazine. One day, she meets Reiji, who lives in the same apartment building, in a state of starvation to the point he cannot move. Afterwards, invited by a senior at work, Serika visits host club Gorgeous and meets Reiji working as a host, which changes her lifestyle.

Last Escort: Club Katze

Plot

Characters 

Tsubasa (つばさ)
Age 23 with a cat-like, capricious personality. He works at his own pace and finds the women who go to host clubs confusing.
Voice actor: Shinnosuke Tachibana

Asato (亞沙斗)　
At age 20, he is the newest host at Club Katze. He has a tall sense of pride and tends to get lonely.
Voice actor: Atsushi Abe

Rei (レイ)
Age 28, he is Club Katze's No.2 host. He pays attention to things Ryuusei overlooks. While initially reserved, he becomes dominant after getting to know him, and he bullies girls he likes.
Voice actor: Yuichi Nakamura

Ryusei (流聖)
At age 30, he is Club Katze's No.1 host, who is very trusted by his colleagues. Although he is a dandy, he may sometimes drop the pretense. He treats customers as if they were his little sister.
Voice actor: Masaki Terasoma

Kanade (奏)　

Voice Actress: Mitsuki Saiga
Age 21. He has a feminine appearance and becomes embarrassed and blushes easily. He adjusts to his customers' feelings.

Hiragi Sannomiya (三ノ宮柊)　
Age 28, he is the owner of Club Katze. As a manager, he is firm and bold. Although he seems quiet, he is rather sadistic and will smile while teasing the people he likes.
Voice actor: Junichi Suwabe

Johann (ヨハン)

Voice actor: Noriaki Sugiyama.

Titles 
* (PS2) January 26, 2006
* (PS2) July 27, 2006
* (PS2) February 21, 2008 Gorgeous Version
* (PS2, PSP) February 18, 2010 with limited edition box set for both platforms. 
* (PSP) July 31, 2014 A limited promotional clear file was given away with the purchase of this version, which was part of a budget series of re-released otome games.

Drama CDs 
Last Escort Dokidoki Romantic Birthday CD (February 1, 2006)
Last Escort ~Shinya no Kokuchou Monogatari~ Drama CD (February 22, 2006, KDCA-0051)
Last Escort 2 ~Shinya no Amai Toge~ Drama CD Ai ni Yogoreta Shirobaratachi no Amai Toge(March 25, 2008, FVCG-1023)
Last Escort 2: Drama CD ~Naze ni Shirobara? Tsuyamachi Kugatsu no Yoru no Yume~ & Character Songs (May 28, 2008, KDSD-00208)

Soundtracks 
Last Escort ~Shinya no Kokuchou Monogatari~ Original Sound Track featuring AN'S ALL STARS (January 25, 2006, KDCA-0048)
Last Escort 2 ~Shinya no Amai Toge~ OP&ED Themes Alice/Again(March 5, 2008, KDSD-00183) - Limited edition first press contains DVD
Last Escort 2: Original Soundtrack Vol. 1 (March 5, 2008, KDSD-00183)
Last Escort 2: Original Soundtrack Vol. 2 (April 9, 2008, KDSD-195)
Last Escort Club Katze Original Song Best (March 17, 2010)

Books 
 Last Escort ~Shinya no Kokuchou Monogatari~ Official Visual Fanbook (March 30, 2006)
 Last Escort Anthology Comic (May 1, 2006)
 Last Escort Official Anthology Comic Shinya no Champagne Call (May 31, 2006)
 Last Escort ~Shinya no Kokuchou Monogatari~ Comic Anthology (July 25, 2006)
 Last Escort Anthology Comic 2 (July 31, 2006)
 Last Escort ~Kokuchou Special Night~ Complete Guide (August 18, 2006)
 Last Escort 2 ~Shinya no Amai Toge~ Official Visual Fanbook (March 28, 2008)
 Last Escort -Club Katze- Official Visual Fanbook (March 15, 2010)

References

External links 
 Official website
 Last Escort: Kokuchou Special Night official site
 Last Escort 2: Shinya no Amai Toge official site
 Last Escort: Shinya no Kokuchou Monogatari at GameFAQs
 Last Escort: Kokuchou Special Night at GameFAQs
 Last Escort 2: Shinya no Amai Toge at GameFAQs
 Last Escort: Club Katze (PlayStation 2) at GameFAQs
 Last Escort: Club Katze (PlayStation Portable) at GameFAQs

2006 video games
2008 video games
2010 video games
PlayStation 2 games
PlayStation Portable games
Video games developed in Japan
Japan-exclusive video games
Otome games
Romance video games
Video games set in Japan
D3 Publisher games
Visual novels
Video games featuring female protagonists
Single-player video games